Victor Serge (December 30, 1890 – November 17, 1947), born Victor Lvovich Kibalchich, was a Russian revolutionary Marxist, novelist, poet and historian. Originally an anarchist, he joined the Bolsheviks five months after arriving in Petrograd in January 1919 and later worked for the Comintern as a journalist, editor and translator. He was critical of the Stalinist regime and remained a revolutionary Marxist until his death. He is best remembered for his Memoirs of a Revolutionary and series of seven "witness-novels" chronicling the lives of Soviet people and revolutionaries and of the first half of the 20th century.

Works available in English

Fiction 
 The Long Dusk or Last Times (1946) Translator: Ralph Manheim; New York : The Dial Press. Translation of Les dernier temps, Montreal 1946.
 The Case of Comrade Tulayev (1967) Translator: Willard R. Trask; New York : New York Review of Books Classics. Translation of L'Affaire Toulaev. Paris 1949.
 Birth of our Power (1967) Translator: Richard Greeman; New York : Doubleday. Translation of Naissance de notre force, Paris 1931.
 Men in Prison (1969) Translator: Richard Greeman; Garden City, NY: Doubleday. Translation of Les hommes dans le prison, Paris 1930.
 Conquered City (1975) Translator: Richard Greeman; Garden City, NY: Doubleday. Translation of: Ville conquise, Paris 1932.
 Midnight in the Century (1982) Translator: Richard Greeman; London : Readers and Writers. Translation of S'il est minuit dans le siècle, Paris 1939.
 Unforgiving Years (2008) Translator: Richard Greeman; New York : New York Review of Books Classics. Translation of Les Années sans pardon, Paris 1971.

Poems 
 Resistance (1989) Translator: James Brooks; San Francisco: City Lights. Translation of Résistance, Paris 1938.

Non-fiction: books 
 From Lenin to Stalin (1937) Translator: Ralph Manheim; New York: Pioneer Publishers. Translation of De Lénine à Staline, Paris 1937.
 Russia Twenty Years After (1937) Translator: Max Shachtman; New York: Pioneer Publishers. Translation of Destin d'une révolution, Paris 1937. Also published as Destiny of a Revolution.
 Memoirs of a Revolutionary, 1901–1941 (2012) Translator: Peter Sedgwick with George Paizis; New York: New York Review of Books Classics. Translation of Mémoires d'un révolutionnaire, 1901–1941, Paris 1951.
 Year One of the Russian Revolution (1972) Translator: Peter Sedgwick; London: Allen Lane. Translation of L'An 1 de la révolution russe, Paris 1930.
 The Life and Death of Leon Trotsky (1973) (with Natalia Sedova Trotsky) Translator: Arnold J. Pomerans; Garden City, NY: Doubleday. Translation of: Vie et mort de Leon Trotsky, Paris 1951.
 What Everyone Should Know About State Repression (1979) Translator: Judith White; London: New Park Publications. Translation of Les Coulisses d'une Sûreté générale. Ce que tout révolutionnaire devrait savoir sur la répression, Paris 1926.
 Notebooks 1936-1947 (2019) Translators: Mitchell Abidor and Richard Greeman; New York: New York Review of Books.

Non-fiction: collections of essays and articles 
 The Century of the Unexpected – Essays on Revolution and Counter-Revolution (1994) Editor: Al Richardson; special issue of Revolutionary History, Vol.5 No.3.
 The Serge-Trotsky Papers (1994) Editor: D.J. Cotterill; London: Pluto.
 Revolution in Danger – Writings from Russia 1919–1921 (1997) Translator: Ian Birchall; London: Redwords.
 The Ideas of Victor Serge: A Life as a Work of Art (1997), Edited by Susan Weissman, London: Merlin Press.
 Witness to the German Revolution (2000) Translator: Ian Birchall; London: Redwords.
 Collected Writings on Literature and Revolution (2004) Translator and editor: Al Richardson; London: Francis Boutle.

Non-fiction: pamphlet 
 Kronstadt '21 (1975) Translator: not named; London: Solidarity.

Sources: British Library Catalogue and Catalog of the Library of Congress.

See also 
 Anarchism in France
 Anti-Stalinist left

Sources 
 
 Adam Hochschild Finding the Trapdoor: Essays, Portraits, Travels (Syracuse University Press, 1997), "Two Russians," pp. 65–87.

Further reading

External links 

 Victor Serge Internet Archive in the Marxists Internet Archive
 Bulletin of the Russian Opposition: "Victor Serge and the IVth International". Statement criticising Serge by the editors of the Bulletin of the Russian Opposition, writing in Quatrième Internationale, April 1939. Source: Victor Serge & Leon Trotsky, La Lutte Contre le Stalinisme. Maspero, Paris, 1977. Translated for Marxist Internet Archive by Mitch Abidor in 2005. Retrieved April 28, 2005.
 Victor Serge Papers. General Collection, Beinecke Rare Book and Manuscript Library.
An essay on Serge by Ben Lerner in The New York Review of Books

1890 births
1947 deaths
Writers from Brussels
Anarcho-communists
Illegalists
Libertarian Marxists
Libertarian socialists
Comintern people
Belgian people of Russian descent
Left communists
Marxist journalists
Russian–French translators
Individualist anarchists
Russian anarchists
Russian communists
Russian socialists
20th-century Russian historians
Russian revolutionaries
Russian people of Polish descent
Soviet expellees
Soviet anarchists
Soviet Trotskyists
Communist writers
Russian Marxist writers
Soviet emigrants to France
Soviet emigrants to Belgium
Soviet emigrants to Mexico
Left Opposition